Muzin may refer to:
Nicolas Muzin, Canadian-American Republican political strategist, attorney and physician
Mūzīn, Iran